Line 8 of Qingdao Metro is a rapid transit line in Qingdao, Shandong, China, which opened on 24 December 2020.

Opening timeline

Stations

Main line

Branch
Under construction, opening in 2027

References

Qingdao Metro lines
2020 establishments in China
Railway lines opened in 2020